De Big van het Regiment  is a 1935 Dutch film directed by Max Nosseck.

Cast
Philip Dorn	... 	Berkhage (as Frits van Dongen)
Fien de la Mar	... 	Fietje
Heintje Davids	... 	Annemie
Jopie Koopman	... 	Nora
Sylvain Poons	... 	Maupie
Johan Kaart	... 	Jan Adriaanse (as Johan Kaart jr.)
Adolphe Engers	... 	Kruitnagel
Hansje Anderiesen	... 	De Big (as Jansje Anderiesen)
Matthieu van Eysden	... 	Piet
Jan Van Ees	... 	Army Officer
Piet Te Nuyl		(as Piet te Nuyl sr.)
Jan C. De Vos		(as Jan C. de Vos jr.)
Jac. Van Bijlevelt		
Cruys Voorbergh		
Jan van Dommelen	... 	Vader van Nora

External links 
 

1935 films
Dutch black-and-white films
Films set in 1915
Films directed by Max Nosseck
Dutch comedy films
1935 comedy films
1930s Dutch-language films